Babak (also Romanized as Bābak) is a village in Sardasht Rural District, in the Central District of Bashagard County, Hormozgan Province, Iran. At the 2006 census, its population was 120, in 35 families.

References 

Populated places in Bashagard County